Ashburn Hall, also known as the Capehart House, is a historic plantation house located near Kittrell, Vance County, North Carolina.  It was built in the 1840s or early 1850s, and is a two‑story, three‑bay, T‑shaped frame dwelling in a restrained Greek Revival style.  It features a broad, one‑story pedimented entrance portico, with four spaced, paired fluted Tuscan order columns.

It was listed on the National Register of Historic Places in 1977.

References

Plantation houses in North Carolina
Houses on the National Register of Historic Places in North Carolina
Greek Revival houses in North Carolina
Houses in Vance County, North Carolina
National Register of Historic Places in Vance County, North Carolina